Events in the year 1933 in India.

Incumbents
 Emperor of India – George V
 Viceroy of India – The Earl of Willingdon

Events
 National income - 19,502 million
 January – Extensive prosecutions of Communists for treason.
 Pakistan Declaration published
 Indian National Congress meeting at Calcutta prevented by the police.
 1 May – Gandhi released.
 8 May – Mohandas Gandhi begins a 3-week hunger strike because of the mistreatment of the lower castes.
 1 August – Rearrest of Gandhi; released on 24 August.
 Gandhi transfers charge of Congress to Nehru.
 26 November - A 20 year old landlord from Pakur named Amarendra Chandra Pandey killed using a Biological agent.

Law
Indian Wireless Telegraphy Act

Births
8 January – Supriya Devi, Bengali actress (born in Burma, now Myanmar) (died 2018).
14 February – Madhubala, actress (died 1969).
18 February – Nimmi, actress. (died 2020).
4 April – Balan K. Nair, actor (died 2000).
20 July – Roddam Narasimha, scientist (died 2020)
31 August – Dhiru Parikh, poet, writer and critic (died 2021)
27 September – Nagesh, comedian actor (died 2009).
3 November – Amartya Sen, economist, philosopher and winner of the Nobel Memorial Prize in Economic Sciences in 1998.
8 December – Narenda Kumar, mountaineer and soldier (died 2020)
28 December – Dhirubhai Ambani, business tycoon (died 2002).

Deaths
 April 2 – Ranjitsinhji, Indian cricketer and ruler of Nawanagar. (b. 1872)

References

 
India
Years of the 20th century in India